Aileen Cynthia Raymond (23 November 1910 – 28 April 2005) was an English television and stage actress.

She was born on the Isle of Wight in 1910.
 
She appeared occasionally on British television.

Raymond married three times; to actor John Mills (1932–1941), to advertising executive Francis Ogilvy (1941–1963), by whom she had two children, one of whom is the actor Ian Ogilvy, and to Charles Buck.

Raymond died in Kensington and Chelsea, London, aged 94. She died five days after her first husband, John Mills.

References

External links

1910 births
2005 deaths
English stage actresses
English television actresses
Actors from the Isle of Wight
20th-century British businesspeople